Miki Kharo England, released in 2006, was the first ever Pothwari comedy telefilm, as well as the first ever production of Pothwariwood, Punjabs newly founded Pothwari language filming industry.

Plot 
Miki Kharo England, meaning 'take me to England', is about a man named "Aftab" (Iftikhar Thakur) who wants to get married and live his life in England. He is very humorous and a fun loving character who does not really have a fixed occupation and enjoys roaming around the village with his two best friends; Shahid and Mithu. He is rejected by his cousin "Tina" who comes to Pakistan from London, England with her mum. She does not like him due to his attitude and unusual habits and falls in love with another boy from that village Shahid a.k.a. Shedu (Anjum Malik) who is also one of Aftabs best friend. Then at the end Tina's mum promises to get Aftab married from England, to a girl she knows and he becomes very excited about the prospects of going to London and living their with his newly wed wife.

Popularity 
Miki Kharo England was very popular and successful amongst the Pothwari/Mirpuri community. Because of its popularity and humour a sequel was made. It was named Main Julian England, meaning "I'm going to England". It carried on the story of how they get married and he plans going to England. It is rumoured that there will be a third sequel to be released. It was also rumoured to be filmed in Bradford, West Yorkshire. But these rumours are still unconfirmed.

Cast 
 Iftikhar Thakur ... Aftab (Sain)
 Shahzada Ghaffar ... Mithu
 Hameed Babar ... Chacha Khabri
 Anjum Malik ... Shahid (Shedu)
 Shagufta Qureshi ... Tina
 Rukhsana Khan ... Musarato (Aftabs Sister)
 Baitan Farooqi ... Meeru (Mithus Dad)
 Ghazala Butt ... "Azra Ni Khala" (Tina's Mum) (Lubna-Ghazal Butt)
 Ifut Chaudhry ... Zubeda (Aftabs Mum)
 Shabbir Mirza ... Aftabs Dad

External links 
 Miki Kharo England - GeoPakistani

Pakistani television films
Pakistani comedy films
Films set in Azad Kashmir
2006 television films
2006 films
Potwari-language films
2006 comedy films